A Sporting Chance refers to the following films:

 A Sporting Chance (1919 Pathe film)
 A Sporting Chance (1919 Paramount film)
 A Sporting Chance (1945 film)